WKFF (102.1 FM, "K-Love") is a radio station broadcasting a contemporary Christian format. Licensed to Sardis, Mississippi, United States, the station is currently owned by George S. Flinn, Jr.

References

External links

Radio stations established in 2004
2004 establishments in Mississippi
K-Love radio stations
KFF